Kosh-Döbö is a village in Ak-Talaa District of Naryn Region of Kyrgyzstan. Its population was 4,483 in 2021. The settlement was established in 1929.

References 

Populated places in Naryn Region